Athikia is a village in the regional unit of Corinthia in Greece. It was the seat of the former municipality of Saronikos.

Populated places in Corinthia
Saronic Gulf